Thaumatopsis melchiellus is a moth in the family Crambidae. It was described by Herbert Druce in 1896. It is found in Guerrero, Mexico.

References

Crambini
Moths described in 1896
Moths of Central America